Đại Nam thực lục (lit. "Veritable Records of the Great South", "Annals of Đại Nam", "Chronicle of Greater Vietnam") was the official history of Nguyễn dynasty, Vietnam. It contained the royal records of the Nguyễn lords, and the imperial annals of Nguyễn dynasty emperors up until Khải Định. Just like other official histories, Đại Nam thực lục was written in Classical Chinese. The annals comprised 584 volumes.

At first the records were called "Đại Nam thật lục" "". During Thiệu Trị's reign however, "" was changed to "", and its pronunciation changed to "thực", because "實" was against the naming taboo of Empress Tá Thiên, Thiệu Trị's mother.

Đại Nam thực lục was the most important primary source regarding the Nguyễn dynasty. It was an important reference of Cao Xuân Dục's Quốc triều chính biên toát yếu and Trần Trọng Kim's Việt Nam sử lược.

History of compilation
Gia Long began the project soon after he  was crowned emperor. However, many records had been scattered and lost during Tây Sơn Wars. In 1811, he gave an order to collect historical records.

The compilation process was carried out during Minh Mạng's reign. The Quốc sử quán was established in 1821 to write royal historical records. Nguyễn Văn Nhơn was appointed the chief editor, while Trịnh Hoài Đức served as his deputy. The draft was completed in 1824.

In 1830, an envoy was dispatched to Qing China. The envoy had a secret mission- to obtain manuscripts of Ming Shilu from China. It is estimated that the Vietnamese obtained the manuscript in 1833. Then, Minh Mạng ordered the draft to be rewritten following the writing style of Ming Shilu. The new version was completed and handed over to the emperor in 1835. Still, Minh Mạng was still unsatisfied with its quality; he would personally edit the text later.

As a form of political censorship, the emperors often became directly involved in the work's compilation.  This custom was abolished after Tự Đức's death.

Contents
Đại Nam thực lục was composed of two parts: Đại Nam thực lục tiền biên (大南寔錄, Prequel Records) Đại Nam thực lục chính biên (大南寔錄, Principal Records). The former were records of the Nguyễn lords while the latter were records of the Nguyễn emperors. Sometimes Đại Nam liệt truyện tiền biên (大南列傳前編, Prequel biographies) and Đại Nam chính biên liệt truyện (大南正編, Principal biographies) were regarded as parts of Đại Nam thực lục.

Đại Nam thực lục tiền biên
Đại Nam thực lục tiền biên was published in 1844.

Đại Nam thực lục chính biên

Đại Nam liệt truyện tiền biên
Đại Nam liệt truyện tiền biên was published in 1852.

Đại Nam chính biên liệt truyện
Đại Nam chính biên liệt truyện contained two collections. The first collection (sơ tập) was published in 1889; the second collection (nhị tập) was published in 1895.

Transmission and modern publication
Đại Nam thực lục was kept secretly in the royal palace. Only few people could read the text. Besides the woodblock version, there were also several manuscript versions. During the French colonial period, Đại Nam thực lục was republished several times by order of the colonial government. 

In 1933, a Japanese scholar, Matsumoto Nobuhiro (松本 信廣), invited George Cœdès to act as an intermediary, and successfully obtained the first six annals of Đại Nam thực lục and liệt truyện from Nguyễn royal palace. When he returned to Japan in 1935, he handed the texts over to the Tokyo Imperial University (now the University of Tokyo), Kyoto Imperial University (now Kyoto University), Tōhō Bunka Gakuin, Tōyō Bunko and Keio University. The Keio University published the annals in 1961.

Annals No. 6 (supplement annals) and No. 7 were completed in 1935; however, they were not published. After WWII, the drafts were finished in Ngô Đình Nhu's official residence. It was not clear who held the drafts after the 1963 South Vietnamese coup. Supposedly, the Vietnamese government came into possession of the drafts and still holds them in the present day.

Đại Nam thực lục was published in the Vietnamese alphabet in the 1960s. The complete version was published in the Vietnamese alphabet in the early 21st century.

Digitization
Đại Nam thực lục tiền biên (vol. 1–2, vol. 3–6, vol. 7–9, vol. 10–12) and part of Đại Nam chính biên liệt truyện sơ tập (vol. 1–3, vol. 4–7, vol. 8–11, vol. 12–15, vol. 16–20, vol. 21–23, vol. 24–29, vol. 30) were digitized by National Library of Vietnam. 

Part of Đại Nam thực lục chính biên Annal No. 4 (vol. 25–29, vol. 66–70) and part of Đại Nam chính biên liệt truyện sơ tập (vol. 32–33) were digitized by Temple University.

Đại Nam liệt truyện tiền biên (vol. 1–2, vol. 3–4, vol. 5–6) was digitized by Bibliothèque nationale de France.

Notes

References
 陳荊和. 1982：「『大南寔録』と阮朝硃本について」『稲・舟・祭：松本信広先生追悼論文集』六興出版。
 林正子. 2000：「『大南寔録』の成立過程：道光五旬節慶賀使節を中心として」『フォーラム』18。
 林正子. 2001：「『大南寔録』の成立過程(2)：フランス支配下における変質を中心として」『人文・自然・人間科学研究』5。
 林正子. 2003：「『大南寔録』の成立過程(3)：阮朝の編纂事業を中心に」『人文・自然・人間科学研究』9。
 林正子. 2008a： 「『大南寔録』の成立過程(4)：『正編第四紀』の黒旗軍記事にみる編纂意図」『跡見学園女子大学文学部紀要』41。
 林正子. 2008b：「『大南寔録』の成立過程(5)：謝貴安『中国実録体史学研究』をめぐって」『跡見学園女子大学文学部紀要』42(1)。
 林正子. 2010：「『大南寔録』の成立過程(6-A)：嘉定と仏山」『跡見学園女子大学文学部紀要』44。
 岩井大慧. 1935：「永田安吉氏蒐集安南本目録」『史学』14(2)、1935。
 松本信広. 1936：「安南史研究上の二資料：Bibliographie annamiteと大南寔録」『史学』15-1。
 Ngô Đức Thọ. 1997: Nghiên cứu chữ huy Việt Nam qua các triều đại / Les Caractères Interdits au Vietnam à Travers l’Histoire. traduit et annoté par Emmanuel Poisson, Hà Nội: Nxb Văn hoá.
 Nguyễn Q. Thắng & Nguyễn Bá Thế. 1992: Từ điển Nhân vật Lịch sử Việt Nam. In lần thứ hai có sửa chữa và bổ sung, Sài Gòn: Nxb KHXH.
 大澤一雄. 1982：「『大南寔録』と松本信廣先生」『稲・舟・祭：松本信広先生追悼論文集』六興出版。
 竹田龍児. 1961：「影印縮刷版「大南寔録」の刊行」『三田評論』597、1961。

External links 

Đại Nam chính biên liệt truyện sơ tập (q.01-03)

Vietnamese books
Nguyen dynasty texts
History books about Vietnam